This is a list of Royal Navy submarines, arranged chronologically. Submarines that are currently active and commissioned are shown below in bold.

Pre-First World War

 
 , launched: 2 October 1901, decommissioned: 5 November 1913
 
 
 
 
 
 , launched: 9 July 1902
 
 
 
 
 
 
 
 
 
 
 
 
 B class
 11 boats, 1904–1906
 C class
 38 boats, 1906–1910

First World War

 D class

 E class

 F class

 S class

 V class

 W class

 G class

 H class

 Nautilus class

 Swordfish class

 J class

 K class
 HMS K1
 HMS K2
 HMS K3
 HMS K4
 HMS K5
 HMS K6
 HMS K7
 HMS K8
 HMS K9
 HMS K10
 HMS K11
 HMS K12
 HMS K13
 HMS K14
 HMS K15
 HMS K16
 HMS K17
 HMS K26
 L class

 M class
 HMS M1
 HMS M2
 HMS M3
 HMS M4
 R class

Interwar years
 HMS X1

 Odin class

 Parthian class

 Rainbow class

 S (Swordfish) class

 River or Thames class
 HMS Thames (N71)
 HMS Severn (N57)
 HMS Clyde (N12)
 Grampus class

 T (Triton) class

 U (Undine) class

Second World War

 S (safari) class (War Emergency Programme)

 T (Tempest) class (War Emergency Programme)

 U (Umpire) class (War Emergency Programme)

 P611 class
 
 
 
 
 United States R-class submarine
 HMS P511
 HMS P512
 HMS P514
 U (Uproar) class

 V (Vampire) class

Cold War

To mid-1950s
 Amphion class
 Amphion (P439/S39/S43) (laid down as Anchorite but name changed before launch)
 Astute (P447/S47/S45)
 Auriga (P419/S19/S69)
 Aurochs (P426/S26/S62)
 Alcide (P415/S15/S65)
 Alderney (P416/S16/S66)
 Alliance (P417/S17/S67) 
 Ambush (P418/S18/S68)
 Anchorite (P422/S22/S64) 
 Andrew (P423/S23/S63)
 Affray (P421) 
 Aeneas (P427/S27/S72/SSG72)
 Alaric (P441/S41)
 Artemis (P449/S39/S49)
 Artful (P456/S56/S96)
 Acheron (P411/S11/S61)
 Ace (P414)
 Achates (P433)
 Explorer class
 
 
 Stickleback class (midget submarines)
 X51 Stickleback
 X52 Shrimp
 X53 Sprat
 X54 Minnow
 Foreign Built
 Graph (P715) – German Type VII U-boat
 Meteorite – German Type XVII U-boat
 N2 – German  Type VII-C/41 U-boat
 X2 – Italian, Archimede-class submarine

Late 1950s to late 1980s
From HMS Porpoise Royal Navy submarines were given their own "S" pennant numbers.

 Porpoise class (Diesel-electric hunter-killer)
 Porpoise, commissioned/decommissioned: 1958–1982
 Narwhal, c/d: 1959–1977
 Finwhale, c/d: 1960–1987 (harbour service from 1979)
 Cachalot, c/d: 1959–1979
 Sealion, c/d: 1961–1987
 Walrus, c/d: 1961–1986
 Grampus, c/d: 1958–1978
 Rorqual, c/d: 1958–1976
 Oberon class (Diesel-electric hunter-killer)
 Oberon, commissioned/decommissioned: 1961–1986
 Onslaught, c/d: 1962–1990
 Orpheus, c/d: 1960–1990 (harbour service from 1987)
 Odin, c/d: 1962–1990
 Otter, c/d: 1962–1991
 Olympus, c/d: 1961–1989
 Oracle, c/d: 1963–1993
 Ocelot, c/d: 1964–1991
 Otus, c/d: 1963–1991
 Opossum, c/d: 1964–1993
 Opportune, c/d: 1964–1993
 Osiris, c/d: 1964–1989
 Onyx, c/d: 1967–1991
 Dreadnought (Nuclear-powered hunter-killer), commissioned/decommissioned: 1963–1980
 Valiant class (PWR1 nuclear-powered hunter-killer)
 Valiant, commissioned/decommissioned: 1966–1994
 Warspite, c/d: 1967–1991
 Resolution class (PWR1 nuclear-powered ballistic missile)
 Resolution, commissioned/decommissioned: 1967–1994
 Repulse, c/d: 1967–1996
 Renown, c/d: 1967–1996
 Revenge, c/d: 1969–1992
 Churchill class (PWR1 nuclear-powered hunter-killer)
 Churchill, commissioned/decommissioned: 1970–1991
 Conqueror, c/d: 1971–1990
 Courageous, c/d: 1971–1992
 Swiftsure class (PWR1 nuclear-powered hunter-killer)
 Swiftsure, commissioned/decommissioned: 1973–1992
 Sovereign, c/d: 1974–2006
 Superb, c/d: 1976–2008
 Sceptre, c/d: 1978–2010
 Spartan, c/d: 1979–2006
 Splendid, c/d: 1981–2004
 Trafalgar class (PWR1 nuclear-powered hunter-killer)
 Trafalgar, commissioned/decommissioned: 1983–2009
 Turbulent, c/d: 1984–2012
 Tireless, c/d: 1985–2014
 Torbay, c/d: 1987–2017
 Trenchant, c/d: 1989-2022
 Talent, c/d: 1990-2022
 Triumph, commissioned: 1991

1990s to present

 Upholder class (Diesel-electric hunter-killer) Transferred to Canada as the Victoria-class submarine
 Upholder, commissioned/decommissioned: 1990–1994
 Unseen, c/d: 1991–1994
 Ursula, c/d: 1992–1994
 Unicorn, c/d: 1993–1994

 Vanguard class (PWR2 nuclear-powered ballistic missile)
 Vanguard, commissioned: 1993
 Victorious, commissioned: 1995
 Vigilant, commissioned: 1996
 Vengeance, commissioned: 1999
 Astute class (PWR2 nuclear-powered hunter-killer)
 Astute, commissioned: 2010
 Ambush, commissioned: 2013
 Artful, commissioned: 2016
 Audacious, commissioned: 2020
 Anson, commissioned: 2022
 Agamemnon, construction began: 2013/Expected commission: 2024
 Agincourt, confirmed, steel cut/Expected commission: 2026
 Dreadnought class (PWR3 nuclear-powered ballistic missile)
Dreadnought, under construction - first elements of construction underway in 2016
 Valiant, under construction
 Warspite, ordered
 King George VI, ordered

See also
 List of submarine classes of the Royal Navy
 Royal Navy Submarine Service
 List of submarines of the Second World War

References

Royal Navy